Raffaele Adorno (Genoa, 1375 - Genova, July 1458) was the twenty-ninth Doge of Genoa.

Bibliography

External links 
 Approfondimenti sul sito Treccani.it

1375 births
1458 deaths
15th-century Doges of Genoa